An altiport is an aerodrome for small airplanes and helicopters, situated on or within mountainous terrain. Altiports are generally characterized by having a runway with an atypical slope to fit in the local topography. Ultimately, this slope helps aircraft decelerating when landing and assists acceleration during takeoff. High altitude results in less lift available to aircraft wings, which requires aircraft to achieve higher speed at takeoff and landing. Such airfields with unusual physical characteristics are frequent in regions such as the French Alps, Himalayan regions, as well as Pacific islands.

Definitions
According to ICAO Document 9150: STOLport Manual: "An altiport may be defined as a small airport in a mountainous area with a steep gradient runway, used for landing up the slope and for take-off down the slope, thereby making use of only one approach/departure area."

According to the former French Technical Instruction on Civil Aerodromes (ITAC) of 2000, an altiport is specifically designed for serving mountainous regions. It features a steep runway that has a single approach/departure path. The runway ends with a section that has a lower slope, as well as an apron with aircraft stands. An altisurface is defined as a graded area that is not an aerodrome but that can be used as a steep runway with a single approach/departure path.

List of altiports

References